Brevard County, Florida provides a number of unique services to help the aged, juveniles, the physically and mentally handicapped, and minorities.

ARC-Brevard, Inc. provides a spectrum of services for the lifespan of 1200 individuals (and their families) with developmental disabilities in nine locations throughout Brevard. Most clients are mentally challenged. ARC furnishes work crews for long-term contract, often for sanitation or lawn care. ARC is funded through various government sources including Medicaid, School Board; also through fundraisers, crafts, and contributions.

Public Housing
The Brevard County Housing Authority acquires and leases housing projects; investigates housing conditions; determines where slums and unsafe housing exist and investigates conditions dangerous to the public. It is managed by a board appointed by the county commission. The board hires the Chief Executive Officer who is paid a salary of $105,063 annually.

Social Services for juveniles 
The Children's Home Society (CHS) provides Florida families with a unique spectrum of social services, including foster care, adoption, child abuse prevention, emergency shelters, group homes, case management, and treatment for developmentally disabled children. It is a 501(c)3 organization.

Among other local services, CHS also runs the Hacienda Girls Ranch which provides a safe haven for forty-five abused, neglected and/or abandoned girls from the ages of 10-18.

Children's Advocacy Center of Brevard is a program of the Space Coast Health Foundation that serves abused and neglected children. Professionals serve children with allegations of abuse, all sexual abuse and the most severe physical abuse and neglect, and their non-offending family members. Onsite crisis and short-term counseling is provided free of charge and without a waiting list. Onsite medical exams, forensic interviews and other assessment services provided by partner, the Child Protection Team.

The Child Care Association of Brevard County, is a private non-profit agency that coordinates child care, early childhood education and early intervention programs and services for families in Brevard County. In April, the Association sponsors a Children's Festival.

Florida is the seventh deadliest state for teen drivers. This has caused much concern for parents and well as local authorities.

In August, the county has staged a parentless "Teen Fest", which is also drugless and alcohol-free! In 2007, it was attended by 800.

The local chapter of American Bikers Aimed Toward Education (ABATE) has sponsored a "Toy Run" the first Saturday in December. This attracted 15,000 bikers to the community to bring toys for sick and needy children. Their efforts fulfilled the community's need.

Status of Women and Minorities

Women

There is a chapter of the National Organization For Women.

The Women's Center provides counseling services, educational programs, criminal justice support/advocacy; crisis counseling; information and referral; personal advocacy; support groups; therapy; translation services; victims compensation claims. Victims served includes adult victims of sexual battery, domestic violence victims; homicide survivors, other violent crime victims, and stalking victims.

The Florida Civil Rights Conference has given an Advocacy Award to The Central Brevard Women's Center in Cocoa Beach.

There is a Junior League of South Brevard. The League raises money for charity during their "Festival of Trees" held in November. About 6,000 people have attended.

Serene Harbor provides a domestic violence hotline which is staffed 24/7 by trained advocates. Information regarding injunctions for protection, safety planning, education, financial and professional services, legal aid, housing, mental health issues, medical care and children's service options are given to hotline callers.

The Salvation Army provides a Domestic Violence Shelter to abused partners and their families.

The Brevard County Commission on the Status of Women advises the County Commission on issues affecting women. Its members are appointed by the County Commission.

Both the County Sheriff and the city of Palm Bay have a reserve status for former law 

enforcement officers who wish to work part time. This has been particularly useful for women needing to focus on their families, as well as the community.

A Sally Ride Science Festival is held in November to promote science careers for girls in grades 5-8. A woman astronaut gives the keynote speech.

In 1994, after hundreds of arrests, the Brevard abortion clinic was 

at the center of a Supreme Court ruling that established buffer zones to protect patients from protesters.

Minorities

In June, the Juneteenth Festival is held, commemorating the freeing of the slaves at the end of the Civil War. This attracts about 500 attendees.

The monthly Brevard Ebony News is a newspaper publishing articles of interest to the Afro-American community.

There are several local chapters of NAACP committed to improving the lot of minorities.

The Alliance for Neighborhood Restoration sponsored the third Youth Crime Prevention Summit, drawing 200 9- to 17-year-olds together to help them make positive life choices and to interact with law enforcement officers. The event was currently funded by a Department of Justice "Weed and seed" grant.

ComeUnity of Brevard in Cocoa, a community-based prevention and development organization, sponsors SoulFest in October.

The Brevard Multi-Cultural Unity Council  has annually sponsored a Race Unity Day celebrating diversity since 1989.

In 1995, the Harry T. and Harriette V. Moore Multi-Cultural Center was created to improve race relations and human relations in Brevard County and the state of Florida. The center sponsors public forums that focus on the value of racial and cultural diversity. Every February they also sponsor a Moore Heritage Festival of the Arts and Humanities. Their slogan is "Building Unity through Diversity."

Local centers for worship include the Islamic Society, and B'ai Hai.

In February the 300 member Indian Association of Brevard sponsors an "Indiafest," a festival featuring food, culture and dancing from India, as well as "Basakhi," a harvest festival. It attracts 6,500 people. They also sponsor an "India Day" around August 15, celebrating India's Independence. In 2006, 4000 people attended.

Local Thai-Americans stage a Songkran Thai New Year Festival in April featuring food and culture of Thailand.

10.4% of the population is black, not far below the national average of 12.7%; 4.6% Hispanic or Latino, compared to the national average of 13.4%.

2,000 individuals of American Indian extraction live in the area—including Cherokees, the original inhabitants of the area when the Europeans arrived . This number represents a slightly higher percentage than Florida as a whole. Each December, The Native Heritage Foundation sponsors a "Gathering and Pow-Wow" to publicize and preserve the Native American culture. This attracts upwards of 1,500 attendees.

In September, the Annual Family Salsa Festival draws about 1000 people where Puerto Rican heritage is celebrated.

References 

Organizations based in Brevard County, Florida
Social work organizations in the United States